In geometry, the Malfatti circles are three circles inside a given triangle such that each circle is tangent to the other two and to two sides of the triangle. They are named after Gian Francesco Malfatti, who made early studies of the problem of constructing these circles in the mistaken belief that they would have the largest possible total area of any three disjoint circles within the triangle.

Malfatti's problem has been used to refer both to the problem of constructing the Malfatti circles and to the problem of finding three area-maximizing circles within a triangle.
Malfatti himself supplied a formula for the radii of the three circles, and they may also be used to define two triangle centers, the Ajima–Malfatti points of a triangle.

The problem of maximizing the total area of three circles in a triangle is never solved by the Malfatti circles. Instead, the optimal solution can always be found by a greedy algorithm that finds the largest circle within the given triangle, the largest circle within the three connected subsets of the triangle outside of the first circle, and the largest circle within the five connected subsets of the triangle outside of the first two circles. Although this procedure was first formulated in 1930, its correctness was not proven until 1994.

Malfatti's problem

 posed the problem of cutting three cylindrical columns out of a triangular prism of marble, maximizing the total volume of the columns. He assumed that the solution to this problem was given by three tangent circles within the triangular cross-section of the wedge. That is, more abstractly, he conjectured that the three Malfatti circles have the maximum total area of any three disjoint circles within a given triangle.
Malfatti's work was popularized for a wider readership in French by Joseph Diaz Gergonne in the first volume of his Annales (1811), with further discussion in the second and tenth. However, Gergonne only stated the circle-tangency problem, not the area-maximizing one.

 

Malfatti's assumption that the two problems are equivalent is incorrect. , who went back to the original Italian text, observed that for some triangles a larger area can be achieved by a greedy algorithm that inscribes a single circle of maximal radius within the triangle, inscribes a second circle within one of the three remaining corners of the triangle, the one with the smallest angle, and inscribes a third circle within the largest of the five remaining pieces. The difference in area for an equilateral triangle is small, just over 1%, but as  pointed out, for an isosceles triangle with a very sharp apex, the optimal circles (stacked one atop each other above the base of the triangle) have nearly twice the area of the Malfatti circles.

In fact, the Malfatti circles are never optimal.

History
The problem of constructing three circles tangent to each other within a triangle was posed by the 18th-century Japanese mathematician Ajima Naonobu prior to the work of Malfatti, and included in an unpublished collection of Ajima's works made a year after Ajima's death by his student Kusaka Makoto. Even earlier, the same problem was considered in a 1384 manuscript by Gilio di Cecco da Montepulciano, now in the Municipal Library of Siena, Italy.  studied a special case of the problem, for a specific isosceles triangle.

Since the work of Malfatti, there has been a significant amount of work on methods for constructing Malfatti's three tangent circles; Richard K. Guy writes that the literature on the problem is "extensive, widely scattered, and not always aware of itself". The problem and its generalizations were the subject of many other 19th-century mathematical publications, and its history and mathematics have been the subject of ongoing study since then.
It has also been a frequent topic in books on geometry.

 and  recount an episode in 19th-century Neapolitan mathematics related to the Malfatti circles. In 1839, Vincenzo Flauti, a synthetic geometer, posed a challenge involving the solution of three geometry problems, one of which was the construction of Malfatti's circles; his intention in doing so was to show the superiority of synthetic to analytic techniques. Despite a solution being given by Fortunato Padula, a student in a rival school of analytic geometry, Flauti awarded the prize to his own student, Nicola Trudi, whose solutions Flauti had known of when he posed his challenge. More recently, the problem of constructing the Malfatti circles has been used as a test problem for computer algebra systems.

Steiner's construction

Although much of the early work on the Malfatti circles used analytic geometry,  provided the following simple synthetic construction.

A circle that is tangent to two sides of a triangle, as the Malfatti circles are, must be centered on one of the angle bisectors of the triangle (green in the figure). These bisectors partition the triangle into three smaller triangles, and Steiner's construction of the Malfatti circles begins by drawing a different triple of circles (shown dashed in the figure) inscribed within each of these three smaller triangles. In general these circles are disjoint, so each pair of two circles has four bitangents (lines touching both). Two of these bitangents pass between their circles: one is an angle bisector, and the second is shown as a red dashed line in the figure. In case of symmetry two of the dashed circles may touch in a point on a bisector, making two bitangents coincide there, but still setting up the relevant quadrilaterals for Malfatti's circles.

Radius formula
The formulae for the three radii are: 

Related formulae may be used to find examples of triangles whose side lengths, inradii, and Malfatti radii are all rational numbers or all integers. For instance, the triangle with side lengths 28392, 21000, and 25872 has inradius 6930 and Malfatti radii 3969, 4900, and 4356. As another example, the triangle with side lengths 152460, 165000, and 190740 has inradius 47520 and Malfatti radii 27225, 30976, and 32400.

Ajima–Malfatti points

Given a triangle ABC and its three Malfatti circles, let D, E, and F be the points where two of the circles touch each other, opposite vertices A, B, and C respectively. Then the three lines AD, BE, and CF meet in a single triangle center known as the first Ajima–Malfatti point after the contributions of Ajima and Malfatti to the circle problem. The second Ajima–Malfatti point is the meeting point of three lines connecting the tangencies of the Malfatti circles with the centers of the excircles of the triangle. Other triangle centers also associated with the Malfatti circles include the Yff–Malfatti point, formed in the same way as the first Malfatti point from three mutually tangent circles that are all tangent to the lines through the sides of the given triangle, but that lie partially outside the triangle, and the radical center of the three Malfatti circles (the point where the three bitangents used in their construction meet).

See also
Circle packing in an equilateral triangle
Circle packing in an isosceles right triangle
Six circles theorem

Notes

References

.
.
.
.
.
.
.
. Continued in vol. 11 (1896), pp. 25–27.

.
.
.
.
.
.
.
.
.
.
.
.
.
.
.
.

.
.
.
.
.
.
.
.
.
.
.
. See also .
.
.
. The cover of Martin's book features an illustration of the Malfatti circles.
.
.
.
. Proposed by Artemas Martin; solved by the proposer and by Asher B. Evans; compare Martin's Question 4401, also in this volume, pp. 102–103, again solved by Evans and Martin. Note further that Martin had asked for a geometrical solution in The Lady's and Gentleman's Diary for 1869 (so appearing in late 1868), with solution in the LDG for the following year, pp. 89–90. Versions of the problem then appear from 1879 in The Mathematical Visitor, edited by Martin.

.
.
.
.
.
.
.
.
.
.
.
.
.
.
.
.
. See in particular section 14, pp. 25–27 of the Engelmann reprint.
.
.
.
.
.
.
.
. See also .
.
.
.

External links

 
 Malfatti's Problem at cut-the-knot

Circle packing
Circles defined for a triangle